Allen Harris Miner (October 18, 1917 – January 4, 2004) was an American director and screenwriter. He served as a photographer during World War II. Miner then directed and wrote for television programs including Perry Mason, Mission: Impossible, The Twilight Zone, Route 66, The Lawless Years, Tales of Wells Fargo, Riverboat and Wagon Train. He died in January 2004 of natural causes in San Marcos, California, at the age of 86.

References 

Bibliography:
 Bernhard Valentinitsch,Gleichgewicht und Machtverhältnisse- Allen H.Miners Frühwerk.In:35mm-retro-film-magazin.Nr. 47(Saarbrücken 2022),p.66-68

External links 

1917 births
2004 deaths
People from Philadelphia
Screenwriters from Pennsylvania
American film directors
American television directors
American male screenwriters
American television writers
American male television writers
20th-century American screenwriters
American photographers
20th-century American photographers
Yale University alumni